Zelig Leib Bardichever (1903–1937) was a Yiddish poet and composer from Bessarabia. His simple yet elegant poems and songs were written in a folkloric style and described the lives and poverty of artisans and common Jews, and of details of life in Romanian towns in years gone by. Although he died young and many of his songs were not properly documented, some of them were published and performed by Leibu Levin and others who had heard and learned them during Bardichever's lifetime.

Biography

Early life
Bardichever was born into a poor family in Bălți, Bessarabia, Russian Empire on June 6 1903; there are conflicting sources. His father, Ayzik-Duvid Haskelevich Bardichever, was an oil merchant who was born in Mohyliv-Podilskyi, Podolian Governorate.  His mother, Haya-Rivka Berkovna Bardichever, was a native of Bălți. Zelig studied in Cheder and Yeshiva as a youth. He began composing his own songs and hymns at a very young age, and developed his appreciation for music through Russian, Moldovan and Yiddish folk songs.  At first, rather than an artist he became a Melamed and teacher of Hebrew and Yiddish. Among his students from that time was the future Israeli literary critic A. B. Yoffe.

Poet and musician career
In the 1920s, he began to compose and perform songs to his own poems in a more organized manner, in the tradition of wandering Jewish folk singers—Broderzingers such as Velvl Zbarzher, Elyakum Zunzer, and Berl Broder. Although they were his original compositions, they were done in a "folksy" style that made them spread easily among other singers, and they became popular among Jewish workers and apprentices in Romania. Other songs, such as his , drew on themes from Romanian folk music.

By the 1930s, despite not publishing his work anywhere, Bardichever's songs continued to grow in popularity. He also wrote melodies to poems of other poets, for example, to the popular elegy "Fun shheinishn Dorf" ( From a neighboring village ) by Hertz Rivkin . During that time he befriended such Yiddish Theatre figures as Yankev Shternberg.

Bardichever became ill with tuberculosis in Iasi in 1937. On his deathbed in the Jewish hospital in Iasi, he called acquaintances of his to dictate some of his songs and poems. However, those notes apparently did not survive. There were other Soviet sources which stated that manuscripts of his music had been destroyed during the Second World War.

Legacy
After his death, Bardichever's songs were published through the efforts of singer and composer Leibu Levin and writer Hersh Segal in Chernivtsi, then part of the Kingdom of Romania.  This short collection, based mostly on the songs Levin had learned and performed while Bardichever was still alive, was first printed in 1939 and later reprinted in Montevideo in 1948 and Rehovot in 1980. Unfortunately, it was only a small selection of his total work, most of which have been lost, and one song was cut by Romanian censors. Because it was assembled from memory after Bardichever's death, there may be aspects of the melodies or text which differed from how he performed them.

In the decades since his death, a number of Bardichever's songs have been performed by Yiddish singers in the Soviet Union, Israel and the United States, including Leibu Levin, Ben Bonus, Nechama Lifshitz, Chava Alberstein, Arkady Gendler, Bina Landau, Mikhail Alexandrovich and others. The Romanian-born Yiddish theatre actor Aryeh Laish also recorded an entire album of Bardichever songs in the 1960s called . In 2009, a DVD was released in Russia with a concert of Arkady Gendler performing Bardichever's songs.

Literature 
 לידער מיט ניגונים (Лидер мит нигуним — Стихи и мелодии). Черновицы, 1939 (Монтевидео: Фарлаг "Зрие", 1948).
 Летящие тени: Стихи еврейских поэтов Бессарабии в переводе с идиша Рудольфа Ольшевского. Кишинёв, 2000.
 Сара Шпитальник. Бессарабский стиль. Кишинёв: Ruxandra, 2005.

External links 
 Грамзаписи Зелика Бардичевера в каталоге Фридмана (Пенсильванский университет)
 DVD "פֿרײען זיך איז גוט" ("Фрейен зих из гит!" — Радоваться — хорошо!): Аркадий Гендлер поёт песни Зелика Бардичевера. СПб.: Еврейский общинный центр Санкт-Петербурга, 2009 (рецензия Валерия Дымшица, рецензия Александра Иванова)

References

Date of birth uncertain
1937 deaths
Tuberculosis deaths in Romania
Yiddish-language poets
Bessarabian Jews
Yiddish theatre performers
People from Bălți
Romanian Jews
20th-century deaths from tuberculosis
1903 births